Read My Lips may refer to:

Film and television
Read My Lips (film) or Sur mes lèvres, a 2001 French film by Jacques Audiard
"Read My Lips" (Batman: The Animated Series), a television episode

Music

Albums
Read My Lips (Jimmy Somerville album) or the title song (see below), 1989
Read My Lips (Melba Moore album) or the title song, 1985
Read My Lips (Sophie Ellis-Bextor album), 2001
Read My Lips (Tim Curry album), 1978
Read My Lips, by Fee Waybill, 1984

Songs
"Read My Lips" (Alex Party song), 1996
"Read My Lips" (Ciara song), 2013
"Read My Lips" (Dottie West song), 1983; covered by Marie Osmond, 1986
"Read My Lips" (Melissa song), 1991
"Read My Lips (Enough Is Enough)", by Jimmy Somerville, 1989
"Read My Lips", by Duran Duran from Liberty, 1990
"Read My Lips", by Loverboy from Wildside, 1987
 "Read My Lips", by Inna and Farina, 2020

See also
"Read my lips: no new taxes", a quote from George H. W. Bush at the 1988 Republican National Convention
Lip reading